is a railway station located in the city of Minamiuonuma, Niigata, Japan, operated by the third sector Hokuetsu Express.

Lines

Station layout
The station has  a single elevated side platform serving a bi-directional track. The platform is short, and can handle trains of only two carriages in length. The station is unattended.

Platforms

Adjacent stations

History
Uonuma-Kyūryō Station opened on 22 March 1997.

Surrounding area

Akakura Tunnel

See also
 List of railway stations in Japan

References

External links

 Hokuetsu Express Station information 

Railway stations in Niigata Prefecture
Railway stations in Japan opened in 1997
Stations of Hokuetsu Express
Minamiuonuma